Asingan, officially the Municipality of Asingan, is a 2nd class municipality in the province of Pangasinan, Philippines. According to the 2020 census, it has a population of 57,811 people.

It is the hometown of President Fidel V. Ramos, the 12th President of the Philippines (1992–1998).

Geography

Barangays
Asingan is politically subdivided into 21 barangays. These barangays are headed by elected officials: Barangay Captain, Barangay Council, whose members are called Barangay Councilors. All are elected every three years.

Climate

Demographics

Economy

Government
Asingan, belonging to the sixth congressional district of the province of Pangasinan, is governed by a mayor designated as its local chief executive and by a municipal council as its legislative body in accordance with the Local Government Code. The mayor, vice mayor, and the councilors are elected directly by the people through an election which is being held every three years.

Elected officials

The composition of the Municipal Government of Asingan as of June 30, 2022

Notable personalities
Fidel V. Ramos – 12th President of the Philippines (1992–1998)
Leticia Ramos Shahani – Senator of the Philippines (1987–1998)
Narciso Ramos – diplomat and father of President Fidel V. Ramos and Senator Leticia Ramos-Shahani. Former Secretary of Foreign Affairs during Marcos presidency.
Retired General Hermogenes Esperon, Jr. – retired general of the Armed Forces of the Philippines under President Corazon C. Aquino and President Fidel V. Ramos. AFP Chief of Staff (2004–2009) under President Gloria Macapagal Arroyo. Present Secretary of National Security Council under President Rodrigo Duterte.
Colonel Vicente S. Santos Jr – founding president of Kapatiran ng mga Kawal na Makawikang Pilipino (KAKAMPI) and author of numerous military books and publications.
Jhong Hilario- well-known TV personality of ABS-CBN and dancer. Current Councilor of the First District of Makati (1st District)
Liza Soberano- well-known TV personality and teen actress of ABS-CBN.

References

External links

 Asingan Profile at PhilAtlas.com
 Municipal Profile at the National Competitiveness Council of the Philippines
 Asingan at the Pangasinan Government Website
 Local Governance Performance Management System
 [ Philippine Standard Geographic Code]
 Philippine Census Information

Municipalities of Pangasinan
Populated places on the Agno River